Laki Ghundaki is a village of Karak District in Khyber Pakhtunkhwa province of Pakistan.  Laki Ghundak is located amidst Karak City and the populous town of Mitha Khel. It is 5 km from Karak city.

Latitude 33 08' 32" Longitude 70 09' 28"

References

Populated places in Karak District
Karak District